Pasadena is an incorporated town located in census division 5 which is in the western portion of Newfoundland, Canada. The community is situated on the shores of Deer Lake at the junction of the North Arm Valley and the Humber Valley.

The town was named after Pasadena, California. The meaning of the name, according to the municipal website of the Californian town, derives from the Ojibwe (Chippewa) word for "valley".

History
The Town of Pasadena formerly consisted of three separate communities: South Brook, Pasadena and Midland.

South Brook
South Brook was located on the sandy shore of Deer Lake. It evolved much  earlier than Pasadena, starting out in the early 1920s as a logging camp for the Bowater Company from Corner Brook. The railway also used South Brook, but only as a stop along its route across the island. In 1921, the census showed that South Brook only had a population of 6 people, within 2 families.

However, South Brook area soon saw an increase in activity, when the Bowaters Company started up its woods operations. It established a bunkhouse, cook-house and a company store to supply the needs of the areas wood camps. These camps would employ as many as 100 loggers during the winter months. Logging was the main industry in South Brook, but it also had a good supply of rock, which was suitable for the building of the power house in Deer Lake, so a quarry was set up and the rock was shipped to Deer Lake by train.

Homes began to spring up in South Brook as the men coming to work in the wood camps brought their families with them.  With women and children living there, schools, medical aid, and recreation facilities were needed.  church services were held in people’s houses at first, but later, all religions used the school as their church.

Pasadena
The second piece of the puzzle begins in St. John's.  In 1923, Leonard Earle, a business man in St. John's, who had a small  farm on the outskirts of the city, heard about some suitable farm land on the West Coast in the Humber Valley area.  Wanting to get into farming full-time, he decided to visit the area and attempt to purchase some land.  He discussed the acquisition of the land with the paper company officials, but the talks foundered when it was discovered that the company did not own the land.  Thus, Earle was forced to return to his small farm in the city.

Ten years later, in 1933, Earle was informed that a  block of land, the same land that he had been interested in years earlier, was for sale.  Seizing the opportunity, he sold his St. John's farm and immediately purchased the farmland in the Humber Valley.  In the summer of 1933, he hired a group of men from Corner Brook to build a house, and with the help of some men that came with him, he cleared the land by hand and capstan.  They built bridges and barns and planted vegetables.  The flat fertile land and the temperate climate provided ideal conditions for growing such crops as potatoes and carrots. Earle decided to call this part of the Humber Valley, Pasadena, in honour of his wife, who had once lived in Pasadena, California, and also in honour of their marriage, as that is where they were married.  The name Pasadena is derived from an Ojibwa (or Chippewa) word meaning "valley", "valley town", "key of the big valley", or "crown of the valley".

The Earles may have been the first family to settle in Pasadena, but it wasn’t long before others became interested in the little community.  The first winter, the Earles were joined by Mr. and Mrs. Joseph Ryan.  Later that same year, three section men with the Newfoundland Railway, Ned Carter, Jim Carter, and Douglas Tapp were transferred to the area.  It was these five families that formed the nucleus of what was to become the Community of Pasadena.

Midland
The third community area, the community of Midland, evolved in 1936 as part of a government relocation program.  Due to a severe decline in the inshore fishery around the Avalon Peninsula, many families were starving and the government of commission began to look for some other means of livelihood for them.

It was on the forest-covered, level land, next door to Pasadena, that the government land settlement began.  It was named Midland because of its position – halfway between Deer Lake and Corner Brook.  Potential settlers for this community came from outlying areas of the island deeply affected by the Great Depression.  The 25 men involved in the resettlement program came from Argentia, Red Island, Lamaline, Burin, Bell Island, and Clarke’s Beach.
In June 1936, the men came to Midland.  With just one tractor, supplied by the government, they started clearing the land, in preparation for their families to join them.  The men cleared two  fields and used them as a community farm until their own individual land was ready.  All vegetables grown were taken to the government store to be sold and any profits were shared among the men.

In September 1936, all 25 homes were ready for occupancy.  The homes were very simple.  There was no electricity or running water and all the bathrooms were located about thirty feet back in the woods.  All homes were built and painted alike. Finally that day in September arrived when the men settlers from Midland went to the railway in Pasadena to meet their families.  To transport their families and their few belongings from the station, a platform with seats was built on a horse-drawn cart.

Over the years, roads were improved and more land was cleared, but the farms never materialized.  Each settler had been given  of land but they only cleared enough land to meet their immediate requirements.  It wasn’t long before many of the men were seeking employment elsewhere, such as the American base: Ernest Harmon Air Force Base in Stephenville and with the Pulp and Paper Industry in Corner Brook.  Several of the original settlers even returned to their home towns, preferring fishing to farming.

Amalgamation
Being in such close proximity to each other, it was inevitable that Pasadena and Midland would eventually become one. They were incorporated in 1955, adopting the name of The Community of Pasadena-Midland.  The first Community Council of Pasadena-Midland consisted of Charles Bonnell, Chairman; Nelson Bennett, Secretary; and Allan French, Councillor.

Very little growth took place in the Community of Pasadena-Midland until 1969 when the community status gave way to town status, and was named the Town of Pasadena.  The first mayor was Gordon Clarke.

The town experienced rapid growth after receiving its town status.  In 1971, the population of Pasadena was 891, but by 1985, it had risen to more than 3,200.  In 1985, after much persistence from the town council, the whole town was serviced with municipal water and sewage, all main streets were paved, and a Town Plan and Development Regulations were in place to ensure the orderly growth and development of the town.

It was about this time that the Department of Municipal Affairs in St. John's began to see the possibilities of another merger, this time between the Town of Pasadena and its much smaller neighbor to the west, the Community of South Brook.  South Brook had not received nearly as much attention as Pasadena, and could benefit greatly if merged with Pasadena.  In 1985, negotiations between the two Councils and the Department of Municipal Affairs for the amalgamation of the Town of Pasadena and the Community of South Brook began.

After much debate between both communities, a consensus was reached, and on January 1, 1986, the Community of South Brook was amalgamated with the Town of Pasadena.  A new town plan had to be drawn up to incorporate the increased municipal boundaries, a new Comprehensive Development Plan was also prepared to ensure linkage of existing municipal services and pre-planned future expansion.  As a result of the continued growth and the addition of the smaller neighboring community, the projections for the future are showing a continuing steady growth in all sections.

Recent History

In 2012, Pasadena celebrated a "Come Home Year" with hundreds of people visiting during the ten days of festivities in late July of that year.

In October 2016, the town officially opened Pasadena Place. Pasadena Place is a town-owned recreational facility and community meeting place. The facility has a gymnasium, community meeting rooms, a walking track, rock wall, community kitchen, and a fitness centre. The municipality's other recreational facilities include playgrounds, a sensory playground, baseball field, softball fields, soccer facilities, basketball court, tennis courts, a pump track  and a number of walking, running, skiing  and outdoor community spaces.

Pasadena's growth has seen an influx of young families. The Treehouse Family Resource Centre has a schedule which is designed to cater to the needs of young families in the town and region.

Demographics 

Local attractions
 Humber Valley Golf Resort
 Marble Mountain Ski Resort
 Pasadena Beach
 Pasadena Ski and Nature Park

See also
 List of cities and towns in Newfoundland and Labrador
 List of people of Newfoundland and Labrador

References

External links
 The Town of Pasadena Official Web Page

Populated coastal places in Canada
Towns in Newfoundland and Labrador
Populated places established in 1958